The Middle Nevka or Srednyaya Nevka is a branch of the Neva river delta in St. Petersburg, Russia.  Flowing between Yelagin, Kamenny and Krestovsky islands, it empties into the Neva Bay.

References

Rivers of Saint Petersburg
Distributaries of the Neva